Molly My Marianne Sandén (born 3 July 1992), also known by her middle name My Marianne, is a Swedish pop singer and voice actress. As a teenager, she represented Sweden in the Junior Eurovision Song Contest in 2006 and participated in Melodifestivalen in 2009, 2012, and 2016. Her sisters Frida and Mimmi are also singers. In 2018, Sandén released her third studio album, Större. Her fourth studio album was released in early 2019, called Det bästa kanske inte hänt än.

Biography
Molly My Marianne Sandén was born in Stockholm. She attended the Adolf Fredrik's Music School. She then attended the gymnasium school Rytmus Music High School, from which she graduated in spring 2011. Sandén practised and wrote music at Helges song studio in Gävle, where she also became a member of the band Helges All Stars with Alice Svensson, Amy Diamond, Zara Larsson, and her sisters Frida and Mimmi.

Career

2006–2007: Junior Eurovision Song Contest
Sandén represented Sweden at the Junior Eurovision Song Contest in 2006, singing "Det finaste någon kan få". She came third, which remains Sweden's best result. She appeared in SVT's New Years' celebrations on 31 December 2006, which was broadcast live from Skansen. She also won the talent competition "Stellar Shots". She performed a duet with Magnus Carlsson in the song "Julens tid är här" ("Christmas time is here") on his Christmas album Spår i snön in 2006.

Sandén also met Markoolio and sang with him during this period, on his new album called Snow at Christmas rock. In summer 2007, Sandén participated in Diggiloo along with Lasse Holm, Linda Bengtzing, Lotta Engberg, Tony Roche, Charlotte Perrelli, Thomas Pettersson, Jan Johansen, Niklas Andersson, Lasse Berghagen, Benjamin Wahlgren and Magnus Johansson.

She sang a duet with Ola Svensson on a Swedish version of "You Are the Music in Me" from the Disney film High School Musical 2. They also sang in the Lilla Melodifestivalen final ahead of the Junior Eurovision Song Contest in 2007. The previous year, Sandén was chosen to present the Swedish votes during the contest.

2008–2016: Melodifestivalen, and Like No One's Watching

Sandén appeared on Så ska det låta on 11 April 2008 with Magnus Bäcklund. In summer 2008, she participated again in Diggiloo with Lasse Holm, Linda Bengtzing, Lotta Engberg, Thomas Pettersson, Måns Zelmerlöw, Nanne Grönvall, Stefan and Kim and Magnus Johansson. A compilation CD was released and included her performances of "Hallelujah" and "Gabriella's song". Her cover of Dea Norberg's song "Den underbara dagen du kommer hem" was used in advertisements for the fast food chain Sibylla in 2008.

Also in 2008, Sandén participated with Janne Schaffer, Jan Johansen, Johan Boding and Sara Löfgren in Sun, Wind & Water, a tribute to Ted Gärdestad. The same year, she and Brandur released a Swedish version of the song "Right Here, Right Now" from High School Musical 3. She participated in the celebrity dancing competition Let's Dance in 2010, which was broadcast on TV4; she placed fourth.

In the 2009 Melodifestivalen, Sandén qualified for the grand final with her song "Så vill stjärnorna" but finished last with only two points, which were awarded by the international jury.

Sandén entered the Melodifestivalen again in 2012, again qualifying for the final with her song "Why Am I Crying", for which she finished in fifth place. In August 2013, Sandén announced the debut of her online clothing brand, 'My by Molly'.

She released the EP titled Like No One's Watching on 12 June 2015. It includes the hit singles "Freak", "Phoenix" and "Like No One’s Watching".

In November 2015, it was announced that Sandén was to participate in the Melodifestivalen for the third time in Melodifestivalen 2016. She performed in the fourth heat in Gävle on 27 February with the song "Youniverse", which she co-wrote with Danny Saucedo and John Alexis. She qualified from the semi-finals to the final on 12 March. In the final, she placed sixth with the juries and televoting and also placed sixth overall.

2017–2019: Större, and Det bästa kanske inte hänt än
Sandén released the studio album Större through Sony on 27 April 2018.  It contains six singles. It peaked at number four in Sweden.

Sandén's fourth studio album, Det bästa kanske inte hänt än, was released on 29 May 2019 under the Sony label. The album contains nine tracks, including two singles and one promotional single. The album peaked at number two on the Swedish album chart.

2020–present: Eurovision Song Contest: The Story of Fire Saga and Dom ska veta
In the Netflix musical film Eurovision Song Contest: The Story of Fire Saga, released in 2020, Sandén lent her voice to all songs performed by the character Sigrit Ericksdóttir, played by Rachel McAdams in the film. The film's soundtrack album, on which Sandén is heavily featured, was nominated for Best Compilation Soundtrack For Visual Media at the 63rd Annual Grammy Awards. The song "Husavik (My Hometown)" was nominated for Best Original Song at the 93rd Academy Awards. Dom ska veta, Sandén's third studio album in Swedish, was released on 7 May 2021 and was preceded by three singles: "Jag mår bra nu" with Newkid, "Kärlek slutar alltid med bråk", and "Nån annan nu".

Personal life
Sandén dated Eric Saade from 2007 to 2012. Sandén was in a relationship with Danny Saucedo from February 2013 to 2019, and they were formerly engaged.

On 28 September 2012, she announced that she had been diagnosed with type 1 diabetes after collapsing while on a trip to Barcelona, Spain.

On January 2023, Sandén announced that she was pregnant with her first child.

Discography

Albums

Studio albums

Soundtrack albums

Extended plays

Singles

As lead artist

As featured artist

Other charted songs

Filmography

Film
 2011: Tangled (Sweden) as Rapunzel
 2020: Eurovision Song Contest: The Story of Fire Saga as Sigrit Ericksdóttir (vocals for singing scenes)

Television
2019: Quicksand as "Singer at funeral"

Awards and nominations
 2012: Blog Awards – Winner "Blog rocket of the year"
 2012: Rockbjörnen – Nominated "Female live artist of the year"(lost to Loreen)
2020: Rockbjörnen – Winner "Female live artist of the year"
2020: P3 Guld P3 Guld – Winner "Guldmicken"
2020: P3 Guld P3 Guld – Winner "Pop of the Year" for "Det bästa kanske inte hänt än"
2020: Grammis – Nominated "Song of the Year" for "Rosa Himmel"
2020: Grammis – Nominated "Lyricist of the Year" for "Det bästa kanske inte hänt än"
2020: Grammis – Winner "Album of the Year" for "Det bästa kanske inte hänt än"
2020: Grammis – Winner "Artist of the Year"
2020: Grammis – Winner "Pop of the Year" for "Det bästa kanske inte hänt än"
2021: Hollywood Music in Media Awards – Nominated "Best Original Song in a Feature Film" for "Husavik"

References

Notes

Sources

External links

21st-century Swedish singers
EMI Records artists
English-language singers from Sweden
Junior Eurovision Song Contest entrants
Living people
People from Huddinge Municipality
People with type 1 diabetes
Singers from Stockholm
Swedish dance musicians
Swedish pop singers
Warner Music Group artists
Swedish voice actresses
21st-century Swedish women singers
1992 births
Melodifestivalen contestants of 2016
Melodifestivalen contestants of 2012
Melodifestivalen contestants of 2009